Hiwassee is a small village in Cherokee County, North Carolina, United States, which sits next to the Hiwassee Dam and the artificially created Hiwassee Reservoir, on Hiwassee River.

Hiwassee Dam 
The Dam itself was constructed between 1936 and 1940 by the Tennessee Valley Authority as part of Roosevelt's New Deal policy. Hiwassee Dam is still maintained by the TVA. It has a height of 307 feet, spans a distance of 1,376 feet across the Hiwassee River and produce 185,000 kilowatts of electricity.

Hiwassee Dam was the world's tallest "overflow" dam until the completion of the Aswan High Dam on the Nile River in Egypt in the early 1970s.  The depth from the top of the spillgates to the bedrock at the face of the dam is 285 feet.

Hiwassee Reservoir 

The reservoir serves recreational, power generation and flood control purposes. It is  surrounded by the Nantahala and Cherokee National Forests and is almost adjacent to the Appalachia Reservoir. Both reservoirs are important for local wildlife such as deer. The reservoir is relatively shallow with an average depth of 142 ft (44 m) and can exceed depths of 200 ft in places.

References

External links
 Hiwassee Reservoir - TVA
 

Hiwassee River
Populated places on the Hiwassee River
Protected areas of Cherokee County, North Carolina
Tennessee Valley Authority
Reservoirs in North Carolina
Nantahala National Forest
Cherokee National Forest
Landforms of Cherokee County, North Carolina